Baliochila minima, the minimal buff, is a butterfly in the family Lycaenidae. It is found along the coast of Kenya. Its habitat consists of coastal forests.

References

Butterflies described in 1933
Poritiinae
Endemic insects of Kenya
Butterflies of Africa